Hoh Glacier is a glacier on Mount Olympus in the Olympic National Park in Jefferson County of the U.S. state of Washington. It is the source of the Hoh River.

Climate 
Based on the Köppen climate classification, Hoh Glacier is located in the marine west coast climate zone of western North America. Most weather fronts originate in the Pacific Ocean, and travel northeast toward the Olympic Mountains. As fronts approach, they are forced upward by the peaks of the Olympic Range, causing them to drop their moisture in the form of rain or snowfall (Orographic lift). As a result, the Olympics experience high precipitation, especially during the winter months. During winter months, weather is usually cloudy, but, due to high pressure systems over the Pacific Ocean that intensify during summer months, there is often little or no cloud cover during the summer.

See also 
List of glaciers in the United States

Further reading 
 Robert Wood, Olympic Mountains Trail Guide: National Park and National Forest, PP 294, 342
 Olympic Mountain Rescue (Society), Climber's Guide to the Olympic Mountains, P 170
 Olympic Mountain Rescue, Olympic Mountains: A Climbing Guide, P 175
 J.L. Riedel, Steve Wilson, William Baccus, Michael Larrabee, T.J. Fudge, Andrew Fountain, Glacier status and contribution to streamflow in the Olympic Mountains, Washington, USA, Journal of Glaciology, Volume 61, Issue 225 2015 , pp. 8–16

References 

Glaciers of Jefferson County, Washington
Glaciers of the Olympic Mountains
Glaciers of Washington (state)